Barrio Italia is a historic neighbourhood in Ñuñoa and Providencia in Santiago, Chile.  The neighbourhood contains a number of heritage buildings where immigrant artisans from different countries lived during Santiago's past.  Most notably, Barrio Italia was historically populated by Italian immigrants after whom the neighbourhood is named.

At present, Barrio Italia is recognized in the Chilean capital for its wide gastronomic offerings, specifically international cuisine, of which there are various restaurants and cafes specializing in Italian, Chilean, Peruvian, Chinese, Ecuadorian, Spanish, French, Texan, Uruguayan, Venezuelan, Vietnamese, Turkish, Indian, and Thai foods. Other amenities within Barrio Italia include shops, warehouses, workshops, the Italian embassy, and various educational institutions. The neighbourhood has a reputation as a bohemian or hipster area of Santiago.

The boundaries of Barrio Italia are Avenue Francisco Bilbao to the north, Avenue José Miguel Claro to the east, Avenue Irarrázaval to the south, and Avenue General Bustamante to the west.  The present-day commercial epicenter of the neighbourhood, however, has its eastern limit at Avenue Salvador. The main street through the neighbourhood is Avenue Italia where the highest concentration of businesses are located.

References

Neighborhoods in Santiago, Chile